Jacobus Gideon Nel Strauss, known as Koos Strauss, Kosie Strauss or J. G. N. Strauss (17 December 19007 March 1990), was a South African politician who was the leader of the South African United Party from 1950 to 1956. He had earlier been minister of agriculture in the cabinet of Jan Smuts from 1943 until the defeat of the Smuts government in 1948. In the 1953 election the United Party under Strauss lost seven seats, while their opponents the National Party gained twenty-five more seats and a majority in Parliament. Following this election, the United Party suffered two splits, creating the Liberal Party and the Union Federal Party.

In 1954, a further split resulted in the National Conservative Party. In 1956, while plagued by ill health and convalescing in England, he asked his party to decide whether they wished to keep him on as leader. They declined to do so: the first time the leader of a South African political party had been forcibly removed. Strauss was succeeded as United Party leader by De Villiers Graaff.

As opposition leader, Strauss accepted political and social segregation of races but opposed the National Party government's disregard for the rule of law and its removal of "Coloured" voters from the electoral rolls which had been entrenched in the South African constitution but arbitrarily removed by the apartheid government.

References 

1900 births
1990 deaths
People from Hantam Local Municipality
Afrikaner people
South African people of German descent
United Party (South Africa) politicians
Members of the House of Assembly (South Africa)
Leaders of political parties
Place of death missing